The Martin-Handasyde Scout 1 was a British biplane aircraft of the early part of the First World War built by Martin-Handasyde Limited.

Design and development
It was a single-seat biplane with a Gnome engine in tractor configuration.

Operational service

Sixty of the S.1 were built and these were used for about 6 months on the Western Front by the Royal Flying Corps before it was relegated to training. Although initially intended for use in Home Defence operating from the UK, it was found to be inadequate for that too. It was reported to be unstable, and it was the aircraft Captain Louis Strange was flying in a combat with a German two-seater, when one of the oddest incidents of WW1 took place. He was changing a drum on his overhead Lewis gun, when the aircraft turned over - and he fell out. However, he held on with one hand to the spade grip of the gun, and somehow managed to hook one leg into the cockpit, then the other. The plane righted itself, and he fell back in, breaking the seat.  The German crew, convinced they saw their opponent fall out, claimed a kill, and were (so it was said by the ace, Bruno Loerzer, who was based in the area),  ribbed afterwards, when no wreckage was found. ('The Friendless Sky' - A McKee)

Operators

Australian Flying Corps
Mesopotamian Half Flight

Royal Flying Corps
No. 1 Squadron RFC
No. 2 Squadron RFC
No. 4 Squadron RFC
No. 5 Squadron RFC
No. 6 Squadron RFC
No. 9 Squadron RFC
No. 10 Squadron RFC
No. 12 Squadron RFC
No. 14 Squadron RFC
No. 16 Squadron RFC
No. 18 Squadron RFC
No. 19 Squadron RFC
No. 20 Squadron RFC
No. 22 Squadron RFC
No. 23 Squadron RFC
No. 24 Squadron RFC
No. 25 Squadron RFC
No. 30 Squadron RFC

Specification

See also

References
Notes

Bibliography

 Angelucci, Enzo. The Rand McNally Encyclopedia of Military Aircraft, 1914–1980. San Diego, California: The Military Press, 1983. .
 Bruce, J.M. War Planes of the First World War: Volume One Fighters. London: Macdonald, 1965.
 Bruce, J.M. The Aeroplanes of the Royal Flying Corps (Military Wing). London: Putnam, 1982.

External links

1910s British fighter aircraft
S.1
Aircraft first flown in 1914